The National Society of Film Critics Award for Best Screenplay is the award given for best screenwriting at the annual National Society of Film Critics (NSFC) Awards. The category was introduced in 1967, in the 2nd awards ceremony.

At the last awards ceremony in 2022, Japanese screenwriters Ryūsuke Hamaguchi and Takamasa Ōe (Drive My Car, 46 points) won ahead of Spaniard Pedro Almodóvar (Parallel Mothers, 22 points) and Paul Thomas Anderson (Licorice Pizza, 20 points).

List of winners

1960s

1970s

1980s

1990s

2000s

2010s

2020s

External links
 List of winners at National Society of Film Critics official website
 National Society of Film Critics Awards at the Internet Movie Database

References

National Society of Film Critics Awards
Screenwriting awards for film
Awards established in 1967